The Agulhas National Park is a South African national park located in the Agulhas Plain in the southern Overberg region of the Western Cape, about  south-east of Cape Town. Although one of the smallest national parks in South Africa, it boasts 2,000 native plant species and a wetland that provides refuge to birds and amphibians.

Points of interest

The primary tourist attraction in the park is Cape Agulhas, the southernmost tip of Africa and the official meeting-point of the Atlantic and Indian Oceans. Nearby is the Agulhas lighthouse, the second-oldest lighthouse in South Africa, which also includes a small museum and tearoom.

 Whale watching in season – November to January.
 Animals to see include the southern right whale, African black oystercatcher, Damara tern and Cape platanna.
 Shipwrecks: several ships, including De Zoetendal, and HMS Arniston. foundered on the rocks near Cape Agulhas. Relics from some of the wrecks can be seen in the Bredasdorp Shipwreck Museum.
 Fynbos: hundreds of indigenous fynbos species are found here.
 A rich fish bank known as the Agulhas Bank.

References

External links

 Agulhas National Park at South African National Parks

Protected areas of the Western Cape
National parks of South Africa
Cape Agulhas Local Municipality